In mathematics, Pascal's simplex is a generalisation of Pascal's triangle into arbitrary number of dimensions, based on the multinomial theorem.

Generic Pascal's m-simplex 
Let m (m > 0) be a number of terms of a polynomial and n (n ≥ 0) be a power the polynomial is raised to.

Let  denote a Pascal's m-simplex. Each Pascal's m-simplex is a semi-infinite object, which consists of an infinite series of its components.

Let  denote its nth component, itself a finite (m − 1)-simplex with the edge length n, with a notational equivalent .

nth component 
 consists of the coefficients of multinomial expansion of a polynomial with m terms raised to the power of n:

where .

Example for  
Pascal's 4-simplex , sliced along the k4. All points of the same color belong to the same n-th component, from red (for n = 0) to blue (for n = 3).

Specific Pascal's simplices

Pascal's 1-simplex 
 is not known by any special name.

nth component 
 (a point) is the coefficient of multinomial expansion of a polynomial with 1 term raised to the power of n:

Arrangement of  

which equals 1 for all n.

Pascal's 2-simplex 
 is known as Pascal's triangle .

nth component 
 (a line) consists of the coefficients of binomial expansion of a polynomial with 2 terms raised to the power of n:

Arrangement of

Pascal's 3-simplex 
 is known as Pascal's tetrahedron .

nth component 
 (a triangle) consists of the coefficients of trinomial expansion of a polynomial with 3 terms raised to the power of n:

Arrangement of

Properties

Inheritance of components 

Example 

For more terms in the above array refer to

Equality of sub-faces 

From this follows, that for given n, all i-faces are numerically equal in nth components of all Pascal's (m > i)-simplices, or:

Example 
The 3rd component (2-simplex) of Pascal's 3-simplex is bounded by 3 equal 1-faces (lines). Each 1-face (line) is bounded by 2 equal 0-faces (vertices):

 2-simplex   1-faces of 2-simplex         0-faces of 1-face
 
  1 3 3 1    1 . . .  . . . 1  1 3 3 1    1 . . .   . . . 1
   3 6 3      3 . .    . . 3    . . .
    3 3        3 .      . 3      . .
     1          1        1        .

Also, for all m and all n:

Number of coefficients 
For the nth component ((m − 1)-simplex) of Pascal's m-simplex, the number of the coefficients of multinomial expansion it consists of is given by:

(where the latter is the multichoose notation). We can see this either as a sum of the number of coefficients of an (n − 1)th component ((m − 1)-simplex) of Pascal's m-simplex with the number of coefficients of an nth component ((m − 2)-simplex) of Pascal's (m − 1)-simplex, or by a number of all possible partitions of an nth power among m exponents.

Example 

The terms of this table comprise a Pascal triangle in the format of a symmetric Pascal matrix.

Symmetry 
An nth component ((m − 1)-simplex) of Pascal's m-simplex has the (m!)-fold spatial symmetry.

Geometry 

Numeric construction 
Wrapped -th power of a big number gives instantly the -th component of a Pascal's simplex.

where .

Factorial and binomial topics
Triangles of numbers